Apricale (locally ) is a comune (municipality) in the Province of Imperia in the Italian region Liguria, located about  southwest of Genoa and about  west of Imperia.

Apricale borders the following municipalities: Bajardo, Castelvittorio, Dolceacqua, Isolabona, Perinaldo, Pigna, Rocchetta Nervina, and Sanremo.

References

External links 

 Tourist info website 

Cities and towns in Liguria